Thomas Bothwell Jeter (October 13, 1827May 20, 1883) was the 79th Governor of South Carolina from September 1, 1880 to November 30, 1880. His home in Union, South Carolina is listed on the National Register of Historic Places.

Born in Santuc, South Carolina, five miles north of Carlisle in Union County, Jeter attended and graduated from South Carolina College in 1846. He was admitted to the bar 1848 and practiced law in the Upstate while concurrently holding the position of president of the Spartanburg and Union Railroad. Additionally during antebellum, he was elected to the South Carolina House of Representatives in 1856. With the outbreak of the American Civil War in 1861, Jeter volunteered for service in the Confederate Army and was made a captain of infantry.

After the war, Jeter resumed his law practice and was elected to the South Carolina Senate in 1872 after becoming disenchanted by Radical Republican rule of the state during Reconstruction. He continued to serve in the Senate and became the President Pro Tempore in November 1877 because of the mass resignations of Republicans after their party's defeat in the gubernatorial election of 1876, thereby giving control of the Senate to the Democrats. Wade Hampton won re-election in 1878 for another two-year term, but did not finish the term because he resigned in 1879 after being elected to the U.S. Senate.

Lieutenant Governor William Dunlap Simpson succeeded Hampton and Jeter as the President Pro Tempore of the Senate, became the Lieutenant Governor. When Simpson resigned on September 1, 1880, upon appointment to be the Chief Justice of the South Carolina Supreme Court, Jeter became the 79th governor of South Carolina and served for three months.

In 1882, Jeter was appointed to the South Carolina Railroad Commission and served until his death on May 20, 1883. He was buried at Forestlawn Cemetery in Union.

The Gov. Thomas B. Jeter House was added to the National Register of Historic Places in 1974.

References

External links 
 SCIway Biography of Thomas Bothwell Jeter
  NGA Biography of Thomas Bothwell Jeter

1827 births
1883 deaths
University of South Carolina alumni
Democratic Party governors of South Carolina
University of South Carolina trustees
19th-century American politicians
People from Union County, South Carolina
People from Union, South Carolina